The Meade County Jail, in Brandenburg, Kentucky, was built in 1906.  It was listed on the National Register of Historic Places in 1984.

It is a two-story common bond brick building with a two-story brick ell.  It overlooks the Ohio River.

It was the third jail of Meade County.  The first was a log building built in 1826. The second was an 1854 brick building.  Bricks from the second jail building were used in the construction of this 1906 building.

Now known as Jailhouse Pizza, the building was featured in an episode of Ghost Hunters  in 2016 and an episode of The Paranormal Journey in 2017.

References

Jails on the National Register of Historic Places in Kentucky
National Register of Historic Places in Meade County, Kentucky
Government buildings completed in 1906
1906 establishments in Kentucky
Rebuilt buildings and structures in the United States
County government buildings in Kentucky
Brandenburg, Kentucky